This is a list of medalists at the final stage of the Rhythmic Gymnastics Grand Prix series, also referred to as Grand Prix Final. Although group events have been competed at the last stage of the Grand Prix series, only medals earned by individual rhythmic gymnasts are officially considered Grand Prix medals and counted for their nation.

Editions

Medalists

1990s 
1994
Grand Prix Final

1995
Alfred Vogel Grand Prix

1996
Grand Prix Final

1997
Alfred Vogel Grand Prix

1998
Grand Prix Final

1999
Grand Prix Final

2000s 
2000
Alfred Vogel Grand Prix

2001
Alfred Vogel Grand Prix

2002
Grand Prix Innsbruck

2003
Grand Prix Innsbruck

2004
Alfred Vogel Grand Prix

2005
Berlin Masters

2006
Berlin Masters

2007
Grand Prix Innsbruck

2008
Grand Prix Slovakia

2009
Berlin Masters

2010s

2010 Berlin Masters

2011 Brno Grand Prix

2012 Brno Grand Prix

2013 Berlin Masters

2014 Grand Prix Innsbruck

2015 Brno Grand Prix

2016 Eilat Grand Prix

2017 Eilat Grand Prix

2018 Marbella Grand Prix

2019 Brno Grand Prix

2020s 
2020
Deriugina Grand Prix

2021
Marbella Grand Prix

2022
Tart Cup Brno Grand Prix

Overall winners
After the Grand Prix Final event, points are added up and overall winners of the Grand Prix circuit are decided. From 1994 to 1997, the gymnast who gathered the biggest number of points in the all-around competitions was declared the winner. Starting in 1998, winners of each of the four apparatus were declared.

References 

Rhythmic Gymnastics Grand Prix
Rhythmic Gymnastics Grand Prix